Paralopostega peleana is a moth of the family Opostegidae. It was first described by Otto Swezey in 1921. It is endemic to the Hawaiian islands of Oahu and possibly Kauai.

The larvae feed on Melicope species, including Melicope rotundifolia and Melicope sandwicensis. They mine the leaves of their host plant. The mine starts as a thread-like mine with numerous longitudinal somewhat parallel loops nearly the length of the leaf and somewhat curved with the concavity towards the margin, the enclosed area eventually becoming a large blotch. The whole mine is usually situated on one side of the midrib and occupying nearly that whole half of the leaf.

External links
Generic Revision of the Opostegidae, with a Synoptic Catalog of the World's Species (Lepidoptera: Nepticuloidea)

Opostegidae
Endemic moths of Hawaii
Moths described in 1921